The British overseas territory of St Helena was represented at the 2006 Commonwealth Games in Melbourne by a small team which took 9 days to reach Australia.

Medals

Saint Helena has never won a medal at the Commonwealth Games.

Athletics 

St. Helena was represented in the men's marathon by Erroll Duncan from Ascension Island, who at 45 ran in his first marathon. As Duncan left the stadium, he was given a huge cheer as he was already so far behind the rest of the field. He finished the race in 14th position (last among the completers) with a time of 3:11:21.

Men
Track & road events

Shooting

Swimming 

Men

References

Nations at the 2006 Commonwealth Games
Saint Helena at the Commonwealth Games